The BDP S-1 (Boyevoi Desantnyi Planer – troops assault glider) was a military glider of the Soviet Union. It was produced by the Bureau of Special Construction (Osoboe Konstruktorskoe Buro) in 1941 as a glider infantry troop transport. It accommodated 20 troops plus one pilot, and had gun ports for defense. Of wooden construction, the glider featured a high aspect ratio, high-cantilever wing and trailing flaps, utilizing a wheeled-carriage for takeoff and landing on plywood runners  Due to the advance of German forces, only seven were built until the factory was moved, and production was shifted to powered aircraft.

Technical data
Type: Battle glider
Crew: Pilot
Payload: 20 soldiers, equipped, or equivalent weight in other cargo.
Towing speed: 100 mph (maximum)
Wingspan: 65.7 ft
Wing area: 481 sq ft
Empty: 5,070 lb
Cargo: 2,630 1b
Total with cargo: 7,700 lb
Maximum airspeed: 100 mph

References

1940s military gliders
1940s Soviet military transport aircraft
Aircraft first flown in 1941
World War II Soviet transport aircraft
BDP S-1